This is a list of Russian towns and cities that were renamed.

Background 
Historical reasons behind geographical renaming were
a particularly large number of cities and towns were renamed in Russia''' after the October Revolution of 1917
more renamings happened during the whole history of the Soviet Union for political reasons
in 1945, German cities around Königsberg were made part of the Kaliningrad Oblast exclave, see list of cities and towns in East Prussia
soon after the reconquest of Southern Sakhalin in 1945, Japanese placenames were replaced with Russian ones.
Circa 1972-73, many Chinese or Chinese-sounding place names in the Russian Far East were replaced with Russian-sounding ones.
in 1991, after the dissolution of the Soviet Union, renamings (often for restoration of original names) happened, although infrequently.

List 
In the list below sometimes the year of renaming appears in brackets after the new name.

Abinsky → Abinsk (1963)
Adygeysk (1969) → Teuchezhsk (1976) → Adygeysk (1992)
Aksayskaya → Aksay (1957)
Alexandria (1838) → Dakhovsky (1864) → Dakhovsky Posad (1874) → Sochi (1896)
Alexandrovsk (1896) → Polyarny (1939)
Alexandrovskaya → Alexandrovka → Alexandrovsky (1917) → Alexandrovsk-Sakhalinsky (1926)
Alexandrovskoye (1860) → Alexandrovka (1926) → Krasnopartizansk (1931) → Kuybyshevka-Vostochnaya (1936) → Belogorsk (1957)
Alexeyevsk (1912) → Svobodny (1917)
Almetyevo → Almetyevsk
Antrea → Kamennogorsk (1948)
Apsheronskaya (1863) → Apsheronsk (1947)
Armyansky Aul (1839) → Armavir (1848)
Arzamas-16 (1946) → Kremlyov (1991) → Sarov (1995)
Astapovo → Lev Tolstoy (1918)
Balanda → Kalininsk (1962)
Bashanta → Gorodovikovsk (1971)
Batalpashinkaya (1804) → Batalpashinsk (1931) → Sulimov (1934) → Yezhovo-Cherkessk (1937) → Cherkessk (1939)
Beloozero (862) → Belozersk (1777)
Belorechenskaya (1863) → Belorechensk (1958)
Beloretsk → Mezhgorye (1995)
Belotsarsk (1914) → Khem-Beldyr (1918) → Kyzyl (1926)
Bikinskaya → Bikin
Biryuch (1905) → Budyonny (1919) → Krasnogvardeyskoye (1958) → Biryuch (2007)
Bobriki → Donskoy
Bobriki → Stalinogorsk (1934) → Novomoskovsk (1961)
Bogdanovo → Spassk → Bednodemyanovsk (1925) → Spassk (2005)
Bolokhovsky → Bolokhovo
Bondyuzhsk (1885) → Bondyuzhsky (1928) → Mendeleyevsk (1967)
Borovskaya Sloboda → Bor (1938)
Beryozovskoye (Björkö) → Koivisto → Primorsk (1948)
Chegem Pervy → Chegem
Chembar → Belinsky (1948)
Chertanla → Novyy Uzen' (1835) → Novouzensk
Chesnokovka → Novoaltaysk (1962)
Chelyabinsk-40 (1945) → Chelyabinsk-65 → Ozyorsk (1994)
Chelyabinsk-70 → Snezhinsk (1991)
Chibyu (1929) → Ukhta (1939)
Chinnay → Krasnogorsk
Cranz → Zelenogradsk (1945)
Dalles (1924) → Lesozavodsk (1932)
Darkehmen → Angerapp (1938) → Ozyorsk (1945)
Derbinskoye (1880) → Tymovskoye (1945)
Dmitriyev → Dmitriyev-na-Svape → Dmitriyev
Dmitrovka (1711) → Dmitrovsk → Dmitrovsk-Orlovsky (1929) → Dmitrovsk (2005)
Dokshukino (1913) → Nartkala (1967)
Dolgoprudny → Dirizhablstroy → Dolgoprudny
Dvigatelstroy → Kaspiysk (1947)
Dzerzhinsky → Sorsk (1966)
Elektroperedacha → Elektrogorsk (1946)
Enso (1887) → Svetogorsk (1948)
Esutoru → Uglegorsk (1946)
Fischhausen → Primorsk (1946)
Friedland → Pravdinsk (1946)
Galkino-Vrasskoye (1884) → Ochiai (1905) → Dolinsk (1946)
Goly Karamysh → Baltser → Krasnoarmeysk (1942)
Gorodetsk → Bezhetsk (1766)
Gorodok → Zakamensk (1959)
Grushyovskaya → Gornoye Grushyovskoye → Alexandrovsk-Grushyovsky → Shakhty (1921)
Gukovsky → Gukovo
Gumbinnen → Gusev
Gundorovka (1681) → Donetsk (1955)
Gzhatsk (1718) → Gagarin (1968)
Heiliegenbeil → Mamonovo (1945)
Heinrichswalde → Slavsk
Iletskaya Zashchita → Iletsk → Iletskoye → Iletskaya Zashchita → Sol-Iletsk
Iman (1859) → Dalnerechensk (1972)
Insterburg → Chernyakhovsk (1946)
Ivanovo-Voznesensk → Ivanovo
Izhevsky Zavod (1760) → Izhevsk (1807) → Ustinov (1984) → Izhevsk (1987)
Izhma (1939) → Sosnogorsk (1957)
Kainsk (1772) → Kuybyshev (1935)
Kalata (1675) → Kirovgrad (1932)
Kaliningrad (1938) → Korolyov (1996)
Kamen → Kamen-na-Obi
Kamenskaya → Kamensk-Shakhtinsky
Kamensky Zavod → Kamensk-Uralsky
Kamyshin (1667) → Dmitriyevsk (1710) → Kamyshin (1780)
Kasivabora → Severo-Kurilsk
Khabarovka → Khabarovsk
Kharovsky → Kharovsk
Khibinogorsk → Kirovsk, Murmansk Oblast
Khlynov → Vyatka → Kirov
Khonto (1789) → Nevelsk (1947)
Khotchino → Gatchina → Trotsk (1923) → Krasnogvardeysk (1929) → Gatchina (1944)
Khrushchyovskaya → Uzlovaya
Kiyskoye → Mariinsk (1856)
Kodinsky → Kodinsk
Kolchugino (1763) → Lenino (1922) → Leninsk-Kuznetsky (1925)
Komsomolsky (1962) → Yugorsk (1992)
Korela → Keksgolm → Priozersk (1948)
Korsakovsky Post → Otomari → Korsakov
Kozlov (1635) → Michurinsk (1932)
Königsberg → Kaliningrad (1946)
Krasnaya Sloboda → Krasnoslobodsk
Krasnoflotsky → Krasnoarmeysky → Krasnoarmeysk
Krasnoyarsk-26 → Zheleznogorsk
Kremlyov → Sarov (1995)
Krestov Brod (1916) → Roshal (1917)
Kseniyevsky (1896) → Asino (1930)
Kudelka (1889) → Asbest (1928)
Kukarka (1594) → Sovetsk (1937)
Kurgannaya → Kurganinsk
Kushvinsky Zavod → Kushva
Kuznetsk (1618) → Novokuznetsk (1931) → Stalinsk (1932) → Novokuznetsk (1961)
Kuznetsovo (1806) → Konakovo (1930)
Labiau → Polessk (1946)
Labinskaya → Labinsk
Lagan (1870) → Kaspiysky (1944) → Lagan (1991)
Lakinsky → Lakinsk
Laptevo (1578) → Yasnogorsk (1965)
Lazdinay (1734) → Lazdenen (1938) → Krasnoznamensk (1946)
Lermontovsky → Lermontov
Likhvin (1565) → Chekalin (1945)
Lopasnya → Chyornoye Ozero → Chekhov
Losinaya Sloboda → Losino-Petrovsky
Lyantorsky → Lyantor
Lyutoga → Rudaka → Aniva
Maoka (Mauka) → Kholmsk
Mechetnaya → Nikolayevsk → Pugachyov
Medvezhyya Gora → Medvezhyegorsk
Melekess → Dimitrovgrad
Mikhaylovskoye → Shpakovskoye → Mikhaylovsk
Mikhaylovsky Zavod → Mikhaylovsk
Mikoyan-Shakhar → Klukhori → Karachayevsk
Mukhtuya → Lensk
Muravlenkovsky → Muravlenko
Mysovaya → Mysovsk → Babushkin
Naberezhnye Chelny → Brezhnev → Naberezhnye Chelny
Nadezhdinsk → Kabakovsk → Nadezhdinsk → Serov
Naykhoro → Gornozavodsk
Nazyvayevskaya → Nazyvayevka → Nazyvayevsk
Neuhausen → Guryevsk
Nevdubstroy (1929) → Kirovsk (1953)
Nevyansky Zavod → Nevyansk
Nezametny (1923) → Aldan (1939)
Nikolayevsky → Nikolayevsk → Nikolayevsk-na-Amure
Nikolo-Pestrovka → Nikolo-Pestrovsky → Nikolsk
Nikolskoye → Nikolsk → Nikolsk-Ussuriysky (1898) → Voroshilov (1935) → Ussuriysk (1957)
Nikolsky Khutor (1860) → Sursk (1953)
Nizhnetagilsky Zavod → Nizhny Tagil
Nizhnevartovsky → Nizhnevartovsk
Nizhnevolzhskoye (1963) → Nizhnevolzhsk (1967) → Narimanov (1984)
Nizhniye Kresty → Chersky (1963)
Nizhny Novgorod → Gorky (1932) → Nizhny Novgorod (1990)
Noda → Chekhov (1947)
Nolinsk (1668) → Molotovsk (1940) → Nolinsk (1957)
Novaya Derevnya → Alexandrovsky → Novonikolayevsky → Novonikolayevsk → Novosibirsk
Novaya Pokrovka → Svoboda (1943) → Liski → Georgiu-Dezh (1965) → Liski (1990)
Novgorod → Veliky Novgorod (1998)
Novo-Mariinsk → Anadyr
Novoalexandrovskaya → Novoalexandrovsk
Novokuybyshevsky → Novokuybyshevsk
Novopavlovskaya → Novopavlovsk
Novotroitsk → Baley
Novovoronezhsky → Novovoronezh
Novy Zay → Zainsk
Novye Petushki → Petushki
Nyakh → Nyagan
Obdorsk → Salekhard
Olensk → Vilyuysk
Olkhovsky → Artyomovsk
Olzheras → Mezhdurechensk
Omutninsky Zavod → Omutninsk
Oraniyenbaum → Lomonosov
Orenburg (1743) → Chkalov (1938) → Orenburg (1957)
Oreshek → Nöteborg → Shlisselburg → Petrokrepost → Shlisselburg
Orlov → Khalturin → Orlov
Osinovka → Osinniki
Ostyako-Vogulsk → Khanty-Mansiysk
Pavlovo → Pavlovsky Posad
Pavlovsk → Slutsk → Pavlovsk
Pechory → Petseri → Pechory
Pereyaslavl-Ryazansky → Ryazan
Permskoye → Komsomolsk-na-Amure
Pervomaysky → Novodvinsk
Pesochnya → Kirov
Petergof → Petrodvorets → Petergof
Petropavlovsky → Petropavlovsky Port → Petropavlovsk-Kamchatsky
Petropavlovsky → Severouralsk
Petrovskoye → Petrovsk-Port → Makhachkala
Petrovskoye → Svetlograd
Petrovsky Zavod → Petrovsk-Zabaykalsky
Pillau → Baltiysk
Pokrovskaya → Pokrovsk → Engels
Pokrovskoye → Pokrovsk
Porechye → Demidov
Poshekhonye → Poshekhonye-Volodarsk → Poshekhonye
Prishib → Leninsk
Protva → Zhukov
Pryoysish-Elau → Bagrationovsk
Pyora → Gondatti → Vladimiro-Shimanovsky → Shimanovsk
Raduga → Vladimir-30 → Raduzhny
Ragnit → Neman
Ranenburg → Chaplygin
Rastyapino → Dzerzhinsk
Rauschen → Svetlogorsk
Raychikha → Raychikhinsk
Romanov-Borisoglebsk → Tutayev
Romanov-na-Murmane → Murmansk (1917)
Romanovsky → Kropotkin
Saint Petersburg (1703) → Petrograd (1914) → Leningrad (1924) → Saint Petersburg (1991)
Samara → Kuybyshev → Samara
Selyutora → Siritoru → Makarov
Semyonovka → Arsenyev
Serdobol → Sortavala
Sereda → Furmanov
Sergiyev Posad → Sergiyev (1919) → Zagorsk (1930) → Sergiyev Posad (1991)
Sergiyevskoye → Plavsk
Shakhty → Gusinoozyorsk
Sharypovskoye → Sharypovo → Chernenko → Sharypovo
Shcheglovo → Shcheglovsk → Kemerovo
Shikhrany → Kanash
Shkotovo-17 → Tikhookeansky → Fokino
Sieklakhti → Lakhdenpokhya
Simbirsk → Ulyanovsk
Skalisty → Gadzhiyevo
Slavyanskaya → Slavyansk-na-Kubani
Solnechnogorsky → Solnechnogorsk
Sorochinskoye → Sorochinsk
Spassk → Spassk-Tatarsky → Kuybyshev → Bolgar
Spasskoye → Spassk → Spassk-Dalny
Spasskoye → Spassk → Spassk-Ryazansky
Stakhanovo → Zhukovsky
Stallupönen → Nesterov
Stary Rogozhsky Yam → Bogorodsk → Noginsk
Stavropol → Togliatti
Stavropol → Voroshilovsk → Stavropol
Stupinskaya → Elektrovoz → Stupino
Suchansky Rudnik → Suchan → Partizansk
Sudostroy → Molotovsk → Severodvinsk
Sundyr → Mariinsky Posad
Suyetikha → Biryusinsk
Sverdlovsk-45 → Lesnoy
Svobodny → Cherepanovo
Svyatoy Krest → Prikumsk → Budyonnovsk → Prikumsk → Budyonnovsk
Syana → Kurilsk
Sysertsky Zavod → Sysert
Taldom → Leninsk → Taldom
Tapiau → Gvardeysk
Tashino → Pervomaysk
Temir-Khan-Shura → Buynaksk
Terijoki → Zelenogorsk
Tetyukhe → Dalnegorsk
Tikhmenevsky → Sikuka → Poronaysk
Tikhoretskaya → Tikhoretsk
Tilsit → Sovetsk
Tomarioru → Tomari
Tomsk-7 → Seversk
Toro → Shakhtyorsk
Troitsa → Udomlya
Troitsko-Zaozyornoye → Zaozyorny
Troitskosavsk → Kyakhta
Troitskoye → Troitsky → Troitsk
Trongzund → Uuras → Trongzund → Vysotsk
Trotsk → Chapayevsk
Truyevo-Naryshkino → Kuznetsk
Tsaritsyn (1589) → Stalingrad (1925) → Volgograd (1961)
Tsarskoye Selo → Detskoye Selo → Pushkin
Tsaryovokokshaysk → Krasnokokshaysk → Yoshkar-Ola
Tsimlyanskaya → Tsimlyansk
Tulatovo → Iriston → Beslan
Turyinsky → Krasnoturyinsk
Tver → Kalinin (1931) → Tver (1990)
Tyndinsky → Tynda
Udinsk → Verhneudinsk → Ulan-Ude
Ulala → Oyrot-Tura → Gorno-Altaysk
Uralmedstroy → Krasnouralsk
Usolye → Usolye-Sibirskoye
Ust-Abakanskoye → Khakassk → Abakan
Ust-Belokalitvenskaya → Belaya Kalitva
Ust-Katavsky Zavod → Ust-Katav
Ust-Medveditskaya → Serafimovich
Ust-Sheksna → Rybansk → Rybnaya Sloboda (1504) → Rybnoy → Rybinsk (1777) → Shcherbakov (1946) → Rybinsk (1957) → Andropov (1984) → Rybinsk (1989)
Ust Zeysky military post → Blagoveshchensk
Vasilyovo → Chkalovsk
Vayenga → Severomorsk
Velikoknyazheskaya → Proletarskaya → Proletarsk
Velyaminovsky → Tuapse
Verkhneudinsky → Verkhneudinsk → Ulan-Ude
Vinodelnoye → Ipatovo
Vladikavkaz → Ordzhonikidze → Dzaudzhikau → Ordzhonikidze → Vladikavkaz
Vladimirovka → Toyokhara → Yuzhno-Sakhalinsk
Volkhovstroy → Volkhov (1940)
Volna-Khristianovsky → Novokhristianovskoye → Khristianovskoye → Digora
Volodary → Volodarsk
Vorontsovo-Alexandrovskoye → Sovetskoye → Zelenokumsk
Voskresenskoye → Voskresensk → Istra (not to be confused with another Voskresensk)
Voznesenskaya → Vereshchagino
Vyzhaikha → Krasnovishersk
Yagoshikha (1723) → Perm (1781) → Molotov (1940) → Perm (1957)
Yakovlevskoye → Privolzhsk
Yama → Yamsky Gorodok → Yama → Yamburg → Kingisepp (1922)
Yauntlatgale → Abrene → Pytalovo
Yegorshino → Artyomovsky
Yekaterinburg (Екатеринбург) → Sverdlovsk → Yekaterinburg
Yekaterinodar (1794) → Krasnodar (1920)
Yekaterinenstadt (Baronsk) → Marxstadt → Marks
Yuryuzansky Zavod → Yuryuzan
Zaozyorny-13 → Krasnoyarsk-45 → Zelenogorsk (1992)
Zarinskaya → Zarinsk
Zatishye → Elektrostal
Zavolzhye → Zavolzhsk
Zavoyko → Yelizovo
Zernovoy → Zernograd
Zeysky Sklad → Zeya-Pristan → Zeya
Zhdanovsk → Zapolyarny
Zheleznodorozhny → Yemva
Zhirnoye → Zhirnovsky → Zhirnovsk
Zimmerbude → Svetly
Zlatoust-36 → Tryokhgorny
Zmeiny → Never-1 → Rukhlovo → Skovorodino

See also
List of inhabited localities in Kaliningrad Oblast, with former names from East Prussia (list)
List of places named after Lenin
List of places named after Stalin
List of renamed cities in Armenia
List of renamed cities in Azerbaijan
List of renamed cities in Belarus
List of renamed cities in Estonia
List of renamed cities in Georgia
List of renamed cities in Kazakhstan
List of renamed cities in Kyrgyzstan
List of renamed cities in Latvia
List of renamed cities in Lithuania
List of renamed cities in Moldova
List of renamed cities in Tajikistan
List of renamed cities in Turkmenistan
List of renamed cities in Uzbekistan
List of renamed cities in Ukraine
 List of names of European cities in different languages
 List of Asian city names in different languages

Further reading
 

Lists of cities in Russia
Russia, Renamed
Renamed, Russia
Russia
 Renamed